Pocahontas County is a county located in the eastern part of the U.S. state of West Virginia.  As of the 2020 census, the population was 7,869. Its county seat is Marlinton. The county was established in 1821. It is named after the daughter of the Powhatan chief of the Native Americans in the United States who came from Jamestown, Virginia. She married an English settler, and their children became ancestors of many of the First Families of Virginia.

Pocahontas County is the home to the Green Bank Observatory and is part of the National Radio Quiet Zone.

History
When Andrew Lewis, early American pioneer, surveyor, and soldier from Virginia, came to survey one of the land grants for the Greenbrier Company in 1751, he found Jacob Marlin and Stephen Sewell living where Marlinton later developed. They had come from Frederick, Maryland, in 1749 and are considered to be the first European settlers in this region of Virginia.  They built their original cabin where Marlin Run met Knapp's Creek. Lewis had found Sewell living in a large hollow sycamore tree near the cabin. This area is now between Eighth and Ninth avenues and Eighth and Ninth streets of Marlinton.

This area was reserved by the nations of the Iroquois Confederacy as a hunting ground, by right of their conquest of tribes that had been in the area. The American Indians resisted Europeans moving into the area. A treaty of 1758 by Great Britain confirmed the land west of the Allegheny Mountains to the Indians and forbade his Majesty's subjects from settling or hunting here.

But the white settlers continued to encroach onto the Indian land, sparking many raids and massacres between the groups. After the Revolution, the Indian squabbles quieted and the settlers' land claims were secured in an orderly manner.

During the Civil War Pocahontas County voted to secede from the United States by a vote of 360 to 13 and supported the state government in Richmond. The county contained 907 men of military age (15-50 years old) and provided nearly 700 men to the Confederate army and levied $15,000 for armaments. Farming and harvesting crops soon became difficult due to enlistments, and many of the county's 252 enslaved population fled during Union troop movements through the county. Some Unionist refugees who had fled to Upshur County enlisted in the 10th West Virginia Infantry Regiment. The battles of Cheat Mountain and Camp Allegheny took place in the county in 1861, and in 1863 the battle of Droop Mountain occurred, resulting in a Union victory.

A government loyal to the United States was established in Wheeling called the Restored Government of Virginia. Under its guidance a bill was introduced to the United States Congress to create a new state from 48 counties of western Virginia to be called West Virginia. While many of these counties were generally loyal to the U.S., many were not but were taken for territorial reasons. The new state was officially recognized on June 20, 1863.

Pocahontas County was added to the new state of West Virginia without the input of the citizens. The new state government in Wheeling reorganized the county militia as a Unionist force. After the war most of the voters in the county were disfranchised due to their support of Richmond and the Confederacy, and full voting rights were not restored until 1871.

The new state government divided the counties into civil townships, with the intention of encouraging local government.  This proved impractical in the heavily rural state, and in 1872 the townships were converted into magisterial districts.  Pocahontas County was initially divided into four townships, each of which was given a patriotic name: Grant, Lincoln, Meade, and Union.  They became magisterial districts in 1872, and all four were renamed the following year: Grant District, originally named for Union General Ulysses S. Grant, became Huntersville District; Lincoln, named after the President, became Edray; Meade, named for General George Meade, became Greenbank, and Union District became Academy.  In the 1890s, Academy District was renamed again, becoming Little Levels.

The railroads came late to Pocahontas County, as building rails over the mountains was a difficult and expensive project. It was not until 1899 that construction began but after that, the task moved with startling speed.  The 1900 census of the county indicates that many European immigrants came to the region as workers on building the railroads through this area.

Commercial timbering quickly began upon completion of the railroads, including a large mill owned by the West Virginia Pulp & Paper Company (now MeadWestvaco) at Cass.  By the end of 1920, dozens of small railroading towns dotted the landscape along the Chesapeake & Ohio Railway line.

Geography
It is the third-largest county in West Virginia by area, and with a mean altitude of  it is the sixth-highest county east of the Mississippi River and the highest county in this region outside Western North Carolina.

The highest point is Thorny Flat on Cheat Mountain in the northwestern part of the county, elevation .

Birthplace of rivers
The county is the site of the headwaters for eight rivers:  Cherry River, Cranberry River, Elk River, Gauley River, Greenbrier River, Tygart Valley River, Williams River, and Shavers Fork of the Cheat River.  The Monongahela National Forest protects much of the river headwaters, thereby helping to ensure improved downstream water quality.

Major highways

 U.S. Highway 219
 U.S. Highway 250
 West Virginia Route 28
 West Virginia Route 39
 West Virginia Route 55
 West Virginia Route 66
 West Virginia Route 84
 West Virginia Route 92

National protected areas
Monongahela National Forest (part)
Cranberry Glades Botanical Area
Gaudineer Scenic Area

Demographics

2000 census
As of the census of 2000, there were 9,131 people, 3,835 households, and 527 families living in the county.  The population density was 10 people per square mile (4/km2).  There were 7,594 housing units at an average density of 8 per square mile (3/km2).  The racial makeup of the county was 98.38% White, 0.78% Black or African American, 0.07% Native American, 0.14% Asian, 0.05% from other races, and 0.58% from two or more races.  0.43% of the population were Hispanic or Latino of any race.

There were 3,835 households, out of which 25.80% had children under the age of 18 living with them, 53.90% were married couples living together, 7.90% had a female householder with no husband present, and 34.10% were non-families. 29.60% of all households were made up of individuals, and 14.40% had someone living alone who was 65 years of age or older.  The average household size was 2.30 and the average family size was 2.83.

In the county, the population was spread out, with 20.90% under the age of 18, 7.00% from 18 to 24, 27.50% from 25 to 44, 27.40% from 45 to 64, and 17.30% who were 65 years of age or older.  The median age was 42 years. For every 100 females there were 106.20 males.  For every 100 females age 18 and over, there were 103.60 males.

The median income for a household in the county was $26,401, and the median income for a family was $32,511. Males had a median income of $26,173 versus $16,780 for females. The per capita income for the county was $14,384.  About 12.70% of families and 17.10% of individuals were below the poverty line, including 20.20% of those under age 18 and 14.60% of those age 65 or over.

2010 census
As of the 2010 United States census, there were 8,719 people, 3,758 households, and 2,373 families living in the county. The racial makeup of the county was 97.8% white, 0.7% black or African American, 0.2% American Indian, 0.2% from other races, and 1.0% from two or more races. Those of Hispanic or Latino origin made up 0.8% of the population. In terms of ancestry, 23.0% were German, 20.1% were Irish, 12.7% were English, 9.9% were American, 5.2% were Scottish, and 5.1% were Dutch.

Of the 3,758 households, 24.1% had children under the age of 18 living with them, 49.1% were married couples living together, 9.1% had a female householder with no husband present, 36.9% were non-families, and 31.3% of all households were made up of individuals. The average household size was 2.24 and the average family size was 2.75. The median age was 47.1 years.

The median income for a household in the county was $32,161 and the median income for a family was $40,906. Males had a median income of $32,411 versus $25,321 for females. The per capita income for the county was $19,763. About 11.8% of families and 15.3% of the population were below the poverty line, including 20.6% of those under age 18 and 11.7% of those age 65 or over.

Politics

Economy

Tourism

As of 2008, there were approximately 30,000 out-of-towners who own property in Pocahontas County. The tourism industry has continued to be one of the county's largest economic industries. The main tourist attraction is Snowshoe Mountain, which attracts thousands of visitors every summer and winter.

Communities

Towns
Durbin
Hillsboro
Marlinton (county seat)

Magisterial districts
Edray
Greenbank
Huntersville
Little Levels

Census-designated places
Arbovale
Bartow
Cass
Frank
Green Bank
Huntersville

Unincorporated communities

Buckeye
Clover Lick
Droop
Dunmore
Edray
Frost
Jacox
Knapp
Mill Point
Minnehaha Springs
Seebert
Slatyfork
Snowshoe
Stony Bottom
Violet

Notable people
Pearl S. Buck, author, was born in Hillsboro.
W. E. Blackhurst, author
William Luther Pierce, leader of the National Alliance lived on property near Mill Point.

In popular culture
The Amnesty campaign of actual play podcast The Adventure Zone takes place in a fictional town within Pocahontas County.

See also
The Pearl S. Buck Birthplace
 Cass Scenic Railroad State Park
 Droop Mountain Battlefield State Park
 Greenbrier River Trail
 Handley Wildlife Management Area
 National Radio Astronomy Observatory
 National Register of Historic Places listings in Pocahontas County, West Virginia
 Watoga State Park
 Shavers Mountain
 Spice Run Wilderness

References

External links

 Pocahontas County Convention and Visitors Bureau
 Historical Sketches of Pocahontas County, West Virginia by William T. Price

 
1821 establishments in Virginia
Populated places established in 1821
Counties of Appalachia